The 2019–20 Slovenian Basketball League, also known as Liga Nova KBM due to sponsorship reasons was the 29th season of the Premier A Slovenian Basketball League. KK Koper Primorska are the defending champions.

On 12 March 2020, the Basketball Federation of Slovenia temporarily suspended its competitions due to the COVID-19 pandemic. On 20 March, the Basketball Federation canceled definitely its competitions due to the COVID-19 pandemic.

Koper Primorska was the defending champion and as a consequence of the COVID-19 pandemic, the Basketball Federation decided not to recognize any team as the champion for the season.

Format

Regular season 
In the first phase, nine teams will compete in a home-and-away round-robin series (16 games total). Cedevita Olimpija will compete in the second phase. All teams advanced from the regular season to one of two postseason stages, depending on their league position.

Second phase 
The top five teams from the regular season will advance to the championship phase. Cedevita Olimpija will start their competition from this phase. These teams will start the second phase from scratch, with no results carrying over from the regular season. Each team will play a total of 10 games in this phase; as in the regular season, a home-and-away round-robin will be used.

The bottom four teams will enter a home-and-away round-robin mini-league where two best teams qualify to quarterfinals. Each teams plays 9 games in this phase.

Playoffs 
Eight teams will join the playoffs.

Teams

Promotion and relegation 
Terme Olimia Podčetrtek was promoted as the winner of the 2018–19 Second League. The club replaced Ilirija, which finished last in the 2018–19 season. 

This is the inaugural season for the newly formed club Cedevita Olimpija (which was created in July 2019 by merging two clubs Olimpija Ljubljana and Cedevita Zagreb) that will take the Olimpija's place in the competition. Also, the club will play in the 2019–20 EuroCup season instead of Cedevita Zagreb.

Venues and locations

Personnel and kits

Managerial changes

Regular season

League table

Results

Championship group

League table

Results

Relegation group

League table

Results

Awards

Regular Season MVP
 Dino Murić (GGD Šenčur)

Weekly MVP

Regular season

Note

 – Co-MVP's were announced.

Second round

MVP of the Month

Statistical leaders

| width=50% valign=top |

Points

|}
|}

| width=50% valign=top |

Assists

|}
|}

Slovenian clubs in European competitions

References

External links
Slovenian Basketball Federation

Slovenian Basketball League seasons
Slovenia
1
Slovenia